Cas4 is an endonuclease found in some CRISPR systems that is used as part of the spacer acquisition stage.

Cas4 is required for efficient prespacer processing by forming a Cas4-Cas1-Cas2 complex. 

In this complex, Cas4 cuts double-stranded substrates with long 3'-overhangs through site-specific endonucleolytic cleavage. 
 
Cas4 closely interacts with the integrase active sites of Cas1, recognizes PAM sequences within the substrate and cleaves precisely upstream of them, ensuring the acquisition of functional spacers.

References 

Enzymes